Cobby may refer to:

 Anita Cobby (1959–1986), Australian murder victim
 Brian Cobby (1929–2012), British actor
 Harry Cobby (1894–1955), Australian air commodore and First World War flying ace
 Steve Cobby, UK musician, composer, DJ and producer

See also
 Cobi (disambiguation)
 Cobbe
 Cobby dog